Little Green may refer to:

Little Green (song), by Joni Mitchell
Little Green (book), a book by Walter Mosley
The athletic teams of Manchester Central High School, New Hampshire, United States, or the name of its student newspaper
Several places in England and Wales:
Little Green, Richmond, London, an open space
Little Green, Cambridgeshire
Little Green, Greater Manchester, near Middleton
Little Green, Nottinghamshire, a village green and hamlet
Little Green, Somerset
Little Green, Burgate, Suffolk, a hamlet
Little Green, Gislingham, Suffolk, a hamlet
Little Green, Wrexham
Little Green, Surrey